Emma Kate Simmons Flint (March 3, 1850 - March 8, 1926) was an American composer who is best known for her piano piece Racquet Galop, which sold over 100,000 copies. She published her music under the name Kate Simmons or E. Kate Simmons.

Simmons was born in Troy, New York, to Mary Sophia Gleason and Joseph Ferris Simmons, a banker. She married the successful businessman Charles Ranlett Flint in 1883 and they lived in Manhattan.

Little is known about Simmons’ education. She donated the money she made from her musical compositions to charity, endowing a bed at St. Luke’s Hospital with the proceeds from Racquet Galop.

Simmons’ music was published in America and internationally by Augener & Co., Carl Fischer Music, Charles Sheard & Co., Edwin Ashdown Ltd., Hachette & Co., and Oliver Ditson & Co. Racquet Galop was arranged for various instruments by Winslow Lewis Hayden and L. Winner, among others. Her compositions included:

Piano 

Berceuse (Cradle Song)
El Fresco Waltz
From East to West Waltz
Gigue Fantastique
Invincible Galop
Lawn Tennis Galop
Poste
Racquet Galop
Racquet Polka
Racquet Quickstep
Royal Fanfare Galop

Voice 
"Good Bye" (text by F. W. Green; arranged by Alfred Lee)
Download sheet music for Racquet Galop by E. Kate Simmons

References 

American women composers
1850 births
1926 deaths